Desitively Bonnaroo is a 1974 album by the New Orleans rhythm and blues musician Dr. John. The album was produced by Allen Toussaint  and features sizable musical support from The Meters. The album mines the territory featured on his previous album In The Right Place. This album spent eight weeks on the Billboard 200 charts, peaking at #105 on June 1, 1974.

The Bonnaroo Music Festival was named after the album title, after the festival's founders looked through old albums for inspiration. Bonnaroo is derived from French bonne /bɔn/, the feminine form of bon /bɔ̃/ meaning "good," and French rue /ry/ meaning "street," translating roughly to "the best on the streets."

Track listing

Personnel

Musicians
 Dr John – guitar, piano, sound effects, vocals
 Allen Toussaint – keyboards, percussion, arrangements, background vocals

The Meters
 Leo Nocentelli – guitar
 Art Neville – keyboards, organ
 George Porter Jr. – bass
 Joseph "Ziggy" Modeliste – drums

Additional musicians
 Gary Brown – alto, soprano & tenor saxophone
 Mark Colby – clarinet, tenor saxophone,
 Whit Sidener – baritone & alto saxophone
 Peter Graves – trombone
 Kenneth Faulk – trumpet, flugelhorn
 Robbie Montgomery, Jessie Smith – background vocals

Technical
 Allen Toussaint – producer
 Karl Richardson – engineer
 Ken Laxton, Roberta Grace – remix engineers
 George Piros – mastering engineer
 Larry Summers – design
 Bob Nall – illustration

References

Dr. John albums
1974 albums
Atco Records albums
Albums produced by Allen Toussaint
Rock-and-roll albums